The 1979 Borno State gubernatorial election occurred on July 28, 1979. GNPP's Mohammed Goni won election for a first term to become Borno State's first executive governor, defeating main opposition NPN's Kam Salem in the contest.

Mohammed Goni emerged the GNPP candidate after being elected in absentia, defeating Abba Jiddum Gana over a wide margin. Goni polled 166 and Gana 18. Goni's running mate was Ibrahim Anas.

Electoral system
The Governor of Borno State is elected using the plurality voting system.

Results
There were five political parties registered by the Federal Electoral Commission (FEDECO) to participate in the election. Mohammed Goni of the GNPP won the contest by polling the highest votes, defeating NPN's Kam Salem.

References 

Borno State gubernatorial elections
Borno State gubernatorial election
July 1979 events in Nigeria